Electoral district of Deer Park was an electoral district of the Legislative Assembly in the Australian state of Victoria.

Members

Election results

References

Former electoral districts of Victoria (Australia)
1967 establishments in Australia
1976 disestablishments in Australia